The Order of Abdón Calderón is an Ecuadorian decoration instituted in 1904 and awarded for extraordinary military service. It is named after Abdón Calderón, the revolutionary hero who died from injuries sustained on May 24, 1822 during the Battle of Pichincha.

Grades and distinctions
Recipients are awarded the decoration for extraordinary military service.

The order has three grades:
 First Class
 Second Class
 Third Class

The ribbon of the order is half yellow, half blue and red. The class of the order is denoted by a star. The First Class star is gold, Second Class is silver, and Third Class is bronze.

Notable recipients
 Edward M. Almond
 Frank Maxwell Andrews
 Edwin Burr Babbitt
 Bernhard of Lippe-Biesterfeld
 Alfred Winsor Brown
 Charles H. Corlett
 Malin Craig
 Willis D. Crittenberger
 Pedro del Valle
 Robert L. Eichelberger
 Dwight D. Eisenhower
 William Halsey, Jr.
 Thomas T. Handy
 Harold D. Hansen
 Harold R. Harris
 Ernest King
 Henry Balding Lewis
 Douglas MacArthur
 George Marshall
 Paco Moncayo
 John C. Munn
 Chester W. Nimitz
 James Garesche Ord
 Harvey Overesch
 Alexander Patch
 Cosimo Rennella
 William R. Schmidt
 John F. Shafroth Jr.
 Lemuel C. Shepherd, Jr.
 Alexander Vandegrift
 Francis Bowditch Wilby
 Charles A. Willoughby
 Edward Ellsberg
 Augusto Pinochet

Sources and references

Abdon Calderon